The Jabara Award for Airmanship, named in memory of Colonel James Jabara (1923-1966), is awarded each year to the United States Air Force Academy graduate whose accomplishments demonstrate superior performance in fields directly involved with aerospace vehicles.

With 15 kills, Colonel Jabara was the second leading Air Force ace of  the Korean War. Colonel Jabara was the First American Jet Ace. Each year the U.S. Air Force Academy and the Association of Graduates  present the Colonel James Jabara Award to an Academy graduate or  graduates whose airmanship contributions are of great significance and set them apart from their contemporaries.

 Each major air command, including the Air Force Reserve Command; field operating agency, including the Air National Guard; and direct reporting unit may submit one nomination  for the award. The winner of the award is authorized to wear the Air Force Recognition Ribbon.

Recipients

References

 
Awards established in 1967
Awards honoring alumni
United States Air Force Academy